Eugène Despois (25 December 1818 – 23 September 1876) was a French translator.

References

1818 births
1876 deaths
École Normale Supérieure alumni
Writers from Paris
19th-century French translators
French male non-fiction writers
19th-century French male writers